Oedochloa is a genus of flowering plants belonging to the family Poaceae.

Its native range is Southeastern Mexico to Tropical America.

Species
Species:

Oedochloa camporum 
Oedochloa ecuadoriana 
Oedochloa grandifolia 
Oedochloa lanceolata 
Oedochloa mayarensis 
Oedochloa minarum 
Oedochloa procurrens 
Oedochloa standleyi

References

Panicoideae
Poaceae genera